The Desert Inn and Restaurant (also known as Wilson's Corner) is a historic site in Yeehaw Junction, Florida, United States. It is located at 5570 South Kenansville Road, next to SR 60. On January 3, 1994, it was added to the U.S. National Register of Historic Places.

History 
In the 1930s, the spot was originally named "Jackass Crossing," a reference to the burros that ranchers rode to Desert Inn.

As early as 1889, the Desert Inn was a bar room and brothel for cowboys and lumber workers. The Desert Inn did not have full-service water and electricity until 1978.

Throughout the years, the Desert Inn was used as a trading post, gas station, and dance hall. In 1994, after being added to the National Register of Historic Places, the unused rooms above the restaurant were converted into a modest museum that featured a bordello suite with red carpet, lace pillows and a swing.

The Desert Inn closed in June 2018.

In the early morning hours of December 22, 2019, a tractor trailer crashed into the side of the inn. The trailer jackknifed and photos show the roof of the inn collapsed onto the roof of the tractor trailer. The president of the Osceola County Historical Society, which owns and operated the Desert Inn, stated that a determination will be made if any part of the building can be saved pending a survey by a structural engineer. Fortunately, a few weeks prior, valuable artifacts from inside the Desert Inn were removed and put in their archives as part of a clean up day and restoration efforts.

Gallery

References

External links
 Osceola County listings at National Register of Historic Places
 Florida's Office of Cultural and Historical Programs
 Osceola County markers
 Desert Inn
 Archive of business's website

Hotel buildings on the National Register of Historic Places in Florida
Buildings and structures in Osceola County, Florida
National Register of Historic Places in Osceola County, Florida
Demolished buildings and structures in Florida